Dodge City Community College (DC3, DCCC) is a public community college in Dodge City, Kansas, United States.

History

Campus
Founded in 1935, Dodge City Community College was located on the third floor of the Senior High School Building at 1601 First Avenue, for 22 years. By 1957, it had grown large enough to require a move to a different location, at 1000 Second Avenue. The college remained there for the next 13 years. In 1965, the Kansas Legislature passed legislation changing control of the state's junior colleges from the State Board of Education to locally elected Boards. Kansas junior colleges became genuine community colleges, answerable to the citizens in their areas. Ford County voted overwhelmingly to assume responsibility for the college, and in the fall of 1965, the county elected its first Board of Trustees. In the fall of 1966, the Student Affairs Division was first established. The Student Affairs encompassed counseling, records and admission, student housing, campus activities, and recreation activities. In October 1966, due to overcrowded classrooms and the increasing need for additional occupational programs, the citizens of Ford County endorsed a $2.5 million bond.  In 1970, DC3 opened its 35th year of operation with a new campus, located on the northwest edge of the city. The college's outstanding design was recognized with an award by the American Institute of Architects. The campus sits on the former site of the James Mooney Ranch. The land was purchased in 1966 from Mr. Mooney.

Radio stations
In 1977, The Federal Communications Commission granted FM broadcast frequency 91.9 and call sign KINF to the college.  KINF began broadcasting from the first floor of the Learning Resource Center. The FCC later granted the college's request to change the call sign to KONQ.

Commercial radio station KEDD, broadcasting on AM frequency 1550, ceased broadcasting April 30, 1987.  The FCC granted the college their frequency, and call sign KDCC, on November 20, 1992.  KDCC began broadcasting from the KEDD building on North 14th Street, north of the campus, and KONQ moved to this location at the same time.

Nickname
The inspiration came from Conquistador Francisco Vásquez de Coronado, whose expedition, looking for Cibola-the "Seven Cities of Gold", crossed the Arkansas River just east of Dodge City in 1541. When the college's first class met on September 10, 1935, one of the new students from New Mexico was familiar with the history of Coronado and suggested the Conquistador be adopted as their nickname. The college's Conquistador symbol recognizes Coronado's early travels in southwestern Kansas, and the conquering spirit of the college's athletic teams.

Campus
The campus encompasses , 20 buildings, a fishing lake, a  fitness trail, basketball, tennis and racquetball courts, and a rodeo arena.

The Student Union is the heart of the campus. It contains the Conq Corral (snack bar, computer center, 4 satellite televisions, and entertainment center), Conq Shop Bookstore (currently in the upper level), Journalism Department, Student Government Association, and Information Center. It is currently under remodelling and its services are currently located in the Learning Resource Center. See www.dc3.edu website for more details.

The Learning Resource Center, or LRC, contains 30,000 volumes of print material, 200 periodicals, a Federal Documents Depository, electronic reference materials, and has access to over 2.5 million titles and 50,000 periodical titles through networking with other Kansas libraries. Access to over 24 million titles in 71,000 libraries in 112 countries is also available by participation in OCLC (Online Computer Library Center), a non-profit computer library service and research organization dedicated to the public purposes of furthering access to the world's information and reducing the rate of rise of library costs. Internet access is available to online reference material and university libraries' catalogs worldwide. The college's television station is located on the second floor. The College archives is also located in the LRC. It is the repository for material related to the history of DC3, including yearbooks, newspapers, flyers, programs, and other historical items.

The Cosmetology/Child Care Building contains the cosmetology program and Cosmetology Salon. The Salon is designed as a laboratory experience for cosmetology students, and is open to the public on a limited basis.

Lake Charles, named after former college president Charles Barnes, is a 1½ acre,  community fishing lake. The lake remains full with water pumped into it by the college. It is stocked with channel catfish, crappie, largemouth bass, trout, and bluegill.

The Little Theatre holds campus performances, special cultural events, lectures, student musical performances, and community meetings. It has a proscenium stage and holds 357 spectators. DC3's Art Gallery is located in the Theatre's lobby.

The Wellness Center, located on the lower level of the Physical Education building, is used by students, staff, and community members. The center offers free weights, stationary bikes, rowing machines, Nordic-Trak ski machine, treadmills, step machines, and aerobic riders. Staff offer individually designed exercise prescriptions, fitness evaluations, body composition analysis, and exercise programs for senior citizens.

The Clyde Tombaugh Astronomy Center is on the southwest campus. Completed in 1996, it consists of two domes, a 10" Meade LX200 Schmidt-Cassagrain telescope, and a 12.5" Parks Optical Newtonian/Cassagrain HIT telescope. The facility is named after Clyde Tombaugh, who discovered Pluto on February 18, 1930, and grew up in Burdett, a small town near Dodge City.

DC3 is only one of a handful of community colleges in the country to own and operate an electron microscope; it is located in the Science and Math building.

DC3 has four residence halls:  Becker, Sheldon, Coleman-Webb, and Jackson. These are usually separated into all-male or all-female residence halls. Becker and Shelden have the same floor plan. Coleman-Webb has two single rooms connected via a bathroom. Jackson Hall is suite style, thus two single rooms share a common space.

Security for the campus and residence halls is present 24 hours a day, 7 days a week.  Staff consists of full-time officers, part-time officers, and student cadets.

Student activities
The college's Student Government Association is an active part of the student body. It is composed of four student body-elected officers, elected representatives from each campus club, and other interested students. Student Government Association members, who sit on numerous College committees, promote students' opinions on college policies, development of student activities, and development of the college as an institution.

Phi Theta Kappa, the international honor society for two-year college students, has an active Kappa Psi Chapter on campus. Its mission is recognizing and encouraging student scholarship, leadership, fellowship, and community service. To be eligible for membership, a student must complete a minimum of 12 hours of associate degree coursework and earn a GPA of 3.5 or higher. Students must maintain a high academic standing throughout their enrollment in the two-year college, which usually means a 3.25 GPA.

International Student Organization offers an opportunity to students of all ethnic origins, especially foreign born, to contribute their ideas and culture to DC3. Some of its fellowship and service activities include guest lectures, field trips, and co-sponsorship of various ethnic day celebrations. This club provides social enrichment for members and non-members and promotes awareness of cultural diversity among all students.

Media
DC3 is the only college or university in the state of Kansas to own and operate both FM and AM radio broadcasting stations, and is one of only 5 community colleges in the state with a radio station. KDCC 1550 AM is located north of the campus on 14th Street, and KONQ 91.9 FM is located on the first floor of the Fine Arts Building.

DC3 television is located in the LRC, and broadcasts on cable TV channel 8.
ConqSports.com carries live streaming audio of Conq sports.
Livestream carries live streaming video of Conq sports.

The Conquistador, the online campus newspaper, reports on campus news, sports, and opinion. It is produced and published by journalism students, and other interested students, faculty, and staff members.  The Conquistador was published biweekly for many years in print, but was dropped in favor of the online version due to budget cuts.

The Golden Shield yearbook has not been published for several years due to budget cuts.

Athletics

The Conqs are members of the Kansas Jayhawk Community College Conference. The men's basketball team has won one national junior college championship.

Conq athletes participate in the following sports:

Men–Baseball, Basketball, Cross Country, Football, Golf, Rodeo, Soccer, Track & Field
Women–Basketball, Cross Country, Golf, Rodeo, Soccer, Softball, Track & Field, Volleyball, Cheer and Dance squads

The DCCC Athletic Hall of Fame has honored outstanding career contributors to Dodge City Community College Athletics

University affiliations
Access University Systems (Access US) program helps DC3 students complete their bachelor's degrees without moving from their home communities. The degree-granting partners are Kansas State University, Fort Hays State University, and Emporia State University.  Participation in courses is face-to-face, IPTV on campus, and online. Programs offered include Bachelor of Science in Elementary Education with English as Second Language emphasis, Bachelor of Science in Social Work, Bachelor of Science in Technology Leadership, and Bachelor of General Studies with Business emphasis. Competitive scholarships up to $750 per semester are available.

Wichita State University College of Education's Plan of Study Guides for Teacher Education Programs facilitate the selection of general education course work at DC3 in preparation for transfer to WSU.

Notable alumni

 Ross Bjork, Athletics Director at the University of Mississippi.
 Nola Ochs, world's oldest college graduate, 2007 Kansas Woman Leader of the Year, and oldest Phi Theta Kappa member. She received her associate degree from DC3 in 1988, and her bachelor's degree from Fort Hays State University in 2007 at age 95.
 Darrin Simmons, Assistant coach for the Cincinnati Bengals
 Steve Tasker, NFL Football Player

References

External links
 

 
Two-year colleges in the United States
Community colleges in Kansas
Educational institutions established in 1935
Education in Ford County, Kansas
Buildings and structures in Dodge City, Kansas
1935 establishments in Kansas
NJCAA athletics